Aghcheh Gonbad (also Romanized as Āghcheh Gonbad; also known as Āghjeh Gonbad and Āghjeh Kand) is a village in Gorgin Rural District, Korani District, Bijar County, Kurdistan Province, Iran. At the 2006 census, its population was 157, in 31 families. The village is populated by Azerbaijanis.

References 

Towns and villages in Bijar County
Azerbaijani settlements in Kurdistan Province